Pedro Mendonça Pinto (born 28 January 1975) is a Portuguese-American journalist. He has been a sports anchor for CNN International based in Atlanta and London, and then was managing director of communications at UEFA in Switzerland. He is founder and CEO of a sports communications agency called Empower Sports.

Early life
Pinto was born in Lisbon, Portugal. While growing up in Portugal, he attended St. Julian's School in Carcavelos and later graduated from American International School of Lisbon. He eventually moved to the United States and graduated from the University of North Carolina at Charlotte with a bachelor's in communications and marketing. He also earned a degree from the Carolina School of Broadcasting. While at UNCC, he worked for three years as a sportswriter and won the "Sportswriter of the Year" award in 1999. He also had internships with the NBA and MSNBC in Charlotte.

Broadcasting career
Pinto started his career with RTP in 1996, hosting a series of cartoon programmes including Hugo. It was at RTP where he earned the opportunity to host the news show Caderno Diário, where he specialized in sports. In 1998 he was hired by CNN International to become a sports anchor and correspondent. He stayed in Atlanta, Georgia, until 2003 and had the opportunity to cover the 2002 FIFA World Cup and multiple UEFA Champions League finals.

In 2003, Pinto decided to return home and went on to anchor the program Últimas Notícias on Sport TV. Pinto stayed until November 2006 when he received an invitation to return to CNN, this time as a sports anchor in London. Pinto has interviewed sports personalities including Ronaldo, Kaká, Robinho, José Mourinho, Roger Federer, Rafael Nadal, Alex Ferguson, Pelé and Novak Djokovic. He continued to anchor the CNN World Sport show and later also hosted a new football programme called CNN FC. He occasionally appears on the Guardian football podcast Football Weekly.

UEFA and FIFA work
Pinto left CNN in 2013 to take the job of Chief of Press at UEFA, working directly with President Michel Platini. He has hosted the UEFA Champions League draws. He also hosted the 2009 FIFA World Player of the Year awards ceremony in Zürich, Switzerland, alongside Charlotte Jackson and the 2010 FIFA Ballon d'Or with Carol Manana. On 30 November 2019, Pinto co-hosted the UEFA Euro 2020 group stage draws with Corina Caragea in Bucharest.

Personal life
Pinto is the founder and CEO of Empower Sports. He is fluent in Portuguese, English, Spanish and French.

References

External links

1975 births
Living people
American sports journalists
Portuguese journalists
Male journalists
American television reporters and correspondents
American people of Portuguese descent
People with acquired American citizenship
American expatriates in the United Kingdom
Portuguese expatriates in the United Kingdom
American expatriates in Switzerland
Portuguese expatriates in Switzerland
People from Lisbon
CNN people
University of North Carolina at Charlotte alumni